Aurelle is an unincorporated community in Union County, Arkansas, United States.

References

Unincorporated communities in Union County, Arkansas
Unincorporated communities in Arkansas